is a Japanese rugby sevens player.

In 2015 he was suspended for six games by the Japan Rugby Football Union for biting an opponent. He graduated from Kwansei Gakuin University.

References

External links
 
 JRFU Player Profile

1992 births
Living people
Sportspeople from Hyōgo Prefecture
People from Hyōgo Prefecture
Male rugby sevens players
Rugby sevens players at the 2016 Summer Olympics
Olympic rugby sevens players of Japan
Japanese rugby sevens players
Japanese rugby union players
Japan international rugby union players
Toshiba Brave Lupus Tokyo players
Japan international rugby sevens players
Sunwolves players
Rugby union flankers
Rugby union number eights